The Reckless is a 1965 Italian drama film directed by Giuliano Montaldo. It was entered into the 15th Berlin International Film Festival.

Plot summary

Cast
 Renato Salvatori ...  Ettore Zambrini 
 Norma Bengell ...  Luciana, moglie di Ettore 
 Antonio Segurini...  Marco, amante di Luciana 
 Marina Malfatti   
 Dino Fontanesi   
 Raffaele Triggia   
 Claudine Auger   
 Iginio Marchesini   
 Gino Agostini  
 Enrico Rame

References

External links 
 
 
 Una bella grinta at Variety Distribution

1965 films
1960s Italian-language films
1965 drama films
Italian black-and-white films
Films directed by Giuliano Montaldo
Films scored by Piero Umiliani
1960s Italian films